Başçeşme can refer to:

 Başçeşme, Bigadiç
 Başçeşme, Bozkurt
 Başçeşme, İspir